Obabakoak is a 1988 novel by the Basque writer Bernardo Atxaga. The title can be translated as "Those from Obaba". The book won the National Novel Prize. The original Basque version was published by Editorial Erein in 1988, and the author's own Spanish version was published by Ediciones B in 1989. An English translation by Margaret Jull Costa based on the Spanish version was published in 1992.

Contents  
 Childhoods 
 Esteban Werfell 
 An exposition of Canon Lizardi's letter
 Post tenebras spero lucem
 If I could, I'd go out for a stroll every night: I. Katharina's statement
 If I could, I'd go out for a stroll every night: II. Marie's statement
 Nine words in honour of the village of Villamediana
 In search of the last word 
 Young and green
 The rich merchant's servant
 Regarding stories 
 Dayoub, the rich merchant's servant
 Mr Smith
 Maiden name, Laura Sligo
 Finis coronat opus
 In the morning
 Hans Menscher
 How to write a story in five minutes
 Klaus Hanhn 
 Marggarete and Heinrich, twins
 I, Jean Baptiste Hargous
 How to plagiarise
 The crevasse
 A Rhine wine
 Samuel Telleria Uribe
 Wei Lie Deshang 
 X and Y 
 The torch 
 By way of an autobiography

Themes
Atxaga described the idea behind the village Obaba: "Obaba is an interior landscape. You don't remember all the places of the past, but what sticks in the memory is this window, that stone, the bridge. Obaba is the country of my past, a mixture of the real and the emotional."

Reception
Maggie Traugott of The Independent wrote: "Atxaga loves parody, riddles, manipulating texts within texts, which could of course all turn pretentious and hard-going if it weren't handled with charm and dexterity." Traugott wrote that the Basque language "has been 'hiding away like a hedgehog', fortifying itself largely on an oral tradition. Atxaga has not only awakened the hedgehog, but has brought it into the context of his own wide and idiosyncratic reading of world literature."

See also
 1988 in literature
 Basque literature

References

1988 short story collections
Basque-language books
Spanish books